In religion and ethics, the inviolability of life, or sanctity of life, is a principle of implied protection regarding aspects of sentient life that are said to be holy, sacred, or otherwise of such value that they are not to be violated. This can be applied to humans, animals or micro-organisms; for instance, in religions that practice Ahimsa, both are seen as holy and worthy of life.

In Christianity

The phrase sanctity of life refers to the idea that human life is sacred, holy, and precious. Although the phrase was used primarily in the 19th century in Protestant discourse, since World War II the phrase has been used in Catholic moral theology and, following Roe v. Wade, Evangelical Christian moral rhetoric.

The sanctity of life principle, which is often contrasted with the "quality of life" to some extent, is the basis of all Catholic teaching about the fifth commandment in the Ten Commandments.

In Eastern religions 
In Western thought, sanctity of life is usually applied solely to the human species (anthropocentrism, sometimes called dominionism), in marked contrast to many schools of Eastern philosophy, which often hold that all animal life is sacred―in some cases to such a degree that, for example, practitioners of Jainism carry brushes with which to sweep insects from their path, lest they inadvertently tread upon them.

See also
 
 Abortion-rights movements
 Anti-abortion movements
 Buddhism
 Jainism
 Consistent life ethic
 Culture of life
 Fetal protection
 Medical ethics
 National Sanctity of Human Life Day (in the US)
 Religion and abortion
 Right to life
 Sanctity of Life Act, US bill, repeatedly introduced since 1995, that has never become law

References

Further reading

Anti-abortion movement
Ethical principles
Medical ethics
Catholic Church and abortion
Jain belief and doctrine
Euthanasia
Opposition to the death penalty